Arin Mirkan (born Deilar Genj Khamis) was a female fighter in the Women's Protection Units (YPJ) who died fighting against the Islamic State of Iraq and the Levant (ISIL) during the Siege of Kobanî on October 5, 2014. She fought on Mishtanour Hill with Rojda Felat, who later became the general commander of the YPJ . On the hill, Mirkan killed herself, along with numerous ISIL fighters, with explosives, to avoid being captured alive by ISIS.

Arin Mirkan was 20 (or 22) and a mother of two. Haj Mansour, the Kurdish defence official in Kobani, reported that Kurdish fighters had been forced to withdraw from a strategic hill south of Kobani. Mirkan stayed behind, attacking ISIL militants as they surrounded her. She eventually detonated explosives attached to her body, killing ten enemy fighters.

Twenty-seven ISIL fighters were thought to have died in the day's clashes, but it is unclear how many were the result of Arin's explosives.

Memorials 
In Kobanî a statue remembering Arin Mirkan was erected. Andrew Webb-Mitchell composed a violin concerto named Arin Mirkan.

References 

Year of birth missing
2014 deaths
Kurdish female military and paramilitary personnel
Kurdish military personnel killed in action